Alicia Louise Bezuidenhout (born 11 September 1967) is a South African former cricketer who played as a right-arm off break bowler. She appeared in six One Day Internationals for South Africa in 1997. She played domestic cricket for North West.

References

External links
 

1967 births
Living people
People from Klerksdorp
South African women cricketers
South Africa women One Day International cricketers
North West women cricketers
20th-century South African women
21st-century South African women